KIOU (1480 AM) is a radio station broadcasting a Christian radio format. Licensed to Shreveport, Louisiana, United States, the station serves the Shreveport area. The station is currently owned by Capital City Radio Corporation.

History
KIOU was first licensed on August 26, 1954 as KJOE. The station was assigned the callsign KLMB on December 1, 1984.  On September 2, 1988, the station changed its callsign to KOKA and again on October 6, 1989 to KIOU.

References

External links

Christian radio stations in Louisiana